Jadduah  is a Syrian village located in Sabburah Subdistrict in Salamiyah District, Hama.

References 

Populated places in Salamiyah District